Army Intelligence may refer to:

 The intelligence component of a given nation's army.
 In the United States, army intelligence is usually referred to as military intelligence (see main article: Military Intelligence Corps (United States Army).

Further reading